766 Moguntia is a minor planet orbiting the Sun. It was discovered on 29 September 1913 at Heidelberg by German astronomer Franz Kaiser, and is named after Mainz, ancient Moguntiacum. This object is a member of the same dynamic asteroid group as 221 Eos, the Eos family. The orbital plane is inclined at an angle of 10.1° to the plane of the ecliptic.

This is an M-type asteroid with a near infrared spectrum that is similar to CO/CV meteorites. An absorption feature at around 1 μm suggests the presence of olivine on the surface. 766 Moguntia spans approximately 31.2 km in girth and is spinning with a rotation period of 4.82 hours.

References

External links 
 Lightcurve plot of 766 Moguntia, Palmer Divide Observatory, B. D. Warner (2010)
 Asteroid Lightcurve Database (LCDB), query form (info )
 Dictionary of Minor Planet Names, Google books
 Asteroids and comets rotation curves, CdR – Observatoire de Genève, Raoul Behrend
 Discovery Circumstances: Numbered Minor Planets (1)-(5000) – Minor Planet Center
 
 

Eos asteroids
Moguntia
Moguntia
MU-type asteroids (Tholen)
19130929